"Chosen" is the debut single by Italian group Måneskin. It was released on 24 November 2017 by Sony Music and was included in their debut EP with the same name.

The band originally performed an early version of Chosen during the auditions of the eleventh season of X Factor Italia. The final song premiered on 23 November 2017 during the fifth episode of the live shows.

The main riff for this song was written by bassist Victoria De Angelis, and the rest originated from that.

Music video
The music video for "Chosen", directed by Trilathera, premiered on 13 December 2017 via Måneskin's official YouTube channel.

Charts

Certifications

References

2017 songs
2017 debut singles
Sony Music singles
Måneskin songs
Songs written by Damiano David
Songs written by Victoria De Angelis